VolleySLIDE is the Sitting Volleyball world educational programme by World ParaVolley, the international federation responsible for all forms of ParaVolley. It is aimed at driving the development of the sport, in line with the Paralympic Movement and global society expectations. World ParaVolley (formerly known as World Organisation Volleyball for Disabled (or WOVD) is a member of International Paralympic Committee and adopted VolleySLIDE back in February 2014.

The notion of 'SLIDE' 

The word ‘volley’ shows its link with the Olympic sport of Volleyball, the word ‘slide’ emphasises the speed, movement, energy and fun of the game.

 Simple - you only need a ball and some kind of divide/net
 Liberating – by allowing individuals to get out of their chair/take their prosthetics off
 Inclusive – integrating disabled and able-bodied players across the world
 Different – you sit on the floor and slide around on your buttocks
 Enjoyable – it is a fast, dynamic and a team sport

That is Sitting Volleyball...

Mission 

To support World ParaVolley with the growth of #SittingVolleyball, by providing aspiring and developing Sitting Volleyball programs with a resource that focuses on the inclusive and accessible natures of the sport.

Aims 

- To offer the leading Sitting Volleyball starter pack teaching/coaching resource, in multiple languages.

- To work with World ParaVolley to provide a ‘central resource base’ of Sitting Volleyball coaching tools.

- To provide a template introductory workshop which covers all aspects of Sitting Volleyball in a fun an engaging way.

- To gather and share insights of leading Sitting Volleyball players and coaches.

- In collaboration with World ParaVolley, share Sitting Volleyball updates and news from around the world.

- To promote Sitting Volleyball to new markets, through the notion of ‘SLIDE’.

What is VolleySLIDE? 

VolleySLIDE is a volunteer-run initiative started to raise greater awareness of Sitting Volleyball and provide a platform for people to go to learn more about the sport.

After only a few months of operation it was adopted as the World ParaVolley Education Programme for Sitting Volleyball and now sits under their Development Director as one of their key delivery elements.

Click here to see the 'What is VolleySLIDE?' presentation.

Educational Materials 

All of the items below are available on the VolleySLIDE website:

Starting up? - A collection of webpages pulling together everything you'd need to know about if you were looking to start Sitting Volleyball in your area.

BumBall - A very basic game which is designed to be a great starting point.  Perfect if you want to get going in a game situation quickly.

Short Resource - Aimed at anyone looking to get started with Sitting Volleyball, whether they be a school teacher or a rehabilitation worker.
Translations - currently available in Croatian, Czech, Danish, Dutch, French, Greek, Italian, Persian, Portuguese, Russian, Slovenian.

Full Resource - Aimed at those looking to deliver a number of sequential sessions / become a regular Sitting Volleyball trainer or coach.
Translations - currently only available in Portuguese as well.

Workshop - a 4-hour theory and practical workshop, all planned and laid out for any experienced deliver or Volleyballer from around the world to pick up and use.  (Remember: these files are intended to be the start point for anyone, not the finished article for everyone.)

Skills and Drills Videos - providing a visual explanation over the technical skills used by players in the game and some activities that coaches can use to develop them.  These have been developed by USA Volleyball.

Educational and Coaching Blogs

Sunday Sitting Supplement Blogs

Competition Blogs

Links

Social media 

Facebook - www.facebook.com/volleyslide

Twitter (English) - www.twitter.com/volleyslide

Twitter (French) - www.twitter.com/volleyslide_fr

Tumblr - http://tumblr.volleyslide.com

YouTube - www.youtube.com/volleyslide

Instagram - http://instagram.com/volleyslide/

Flickr - https://www.flickr.com/photos/volleyslide/

Leader and Founder 

Matt Rogers is the 'brainchild,' founder and leader of the VolleySLIDE initiative.  Initially it started as a pack of Resource cards for teachers and coaches to use in the Surrey region of England.  Following the interest that they received some educational blogs were written to partner the resource and then some social media accounts were created to help tell people about what was available.  It has gone from strength to strength with the simple hope of it helping Sitting Volleyball maximize its true potential to be a ‘tool for positive social change’.

Previously Matt has been the Volleyball England's Sitting Volleyball Development Manager, London 2012 Technical Operations Manager for Sitting Volleyball [and Volleyball] and W.O.V.D. Technical Commission Member.  When asked why he started VolleySLIDE he explained: “In 2009 I took on a role where I needed to develop two GBR performance National teams to compete in the London 2012 Paralympic Games.  For a sport very much in his infancy, I was amazed at how little there was out there to help people looking to start the sport in a new country or area.

So following the Games I set about creating something that could help those in my position in the future, as well as provide a platform for everyone already involved in the sport to stay connected with other.  I hope that the Sitting Volleyball community embraces the potential of VolleySLIDE and works with us to share our sport with the millions of people around the world who can enjoy and benefit from it.”

Click here for more information

Contributors 

VolleySLIDE is run by 6 voluntary coordinators who together lead on the promotion and integration of VolleySLIDE worldwide.  Each are appointed due to their knowledge and passion for the sport of Sitting Volleyball as well as their skillsets relative to the role.

Click here for more information

In addition there is a growing network of voluntary translators who contribute Sitting Volleyball news from around the world as well as translate any of the VolleySLIDE materials that are requested.

Click here for more information

Contact 

If you are interested in using or engaging with VolleySLIDE in any way, please Tweet us on @volleyslide or e-mail us at: info@volleyslide.net

References

External links 
 VolleySLIDE Official Website - www.volleyslide.net
 VolleySLIDE Central Resource Base - a collection of all that us useful when learning or starting with Sitting Volleyball
 VolleySLIDE Players Site - an external site that highlights the worlds leading teams and players
 VolleySLIDE Coaches Site - providing the background and advice from some of the worlds leading coaches
 VolleySLIDE Competition Blogging Site - presenting the thoughts and experiences of players from some of the recent major championships

Parasports organizations
Disability organisations based in the United Kingdom
Sitting volleyball